The Austrian Basketball Superliga (English: Basketball Super League) is the highest tier basketball league in Austria. Established in 2019, it replaced the Austrian Basketball Bundesliga (ABL) as the first level competition in the country. The winners of the Superliga are crowned Austrian champions. The competition aims to start "a new era" in Austrian basketball. In its inaugural season, the competition consists of ten teams.

History
The Basketball Superliga was established in the summer of 2019 to replace the Austrian Bundsliga. Television contracts were signed with Sky Sport and ORF. All games will also be streamed online. On 9 August 2019, the ten teams that would compete in the inaugural season were announced, with nine teams coming from last ÖBL season.

The new league's first season was ended prematurely because of the COVID-19 pandemic.

On 16 May 2021, Swans Gmunden won the first Superliga championship.

Format
In the Superliga, teams first play each other in the regular season home and away. After this the teams ranked 1–6 and 7-10 are divided in two groups to qualify for the playoffs. In the playoffs, the best eight teams play each other for the national championship in best-of-five series. The two lowest placed teams play against the top two teams of the Basketball Zweite Liga (B2L).

Clubs

Champions

References

External links
 Eurobasket.com League Page

Ost
Austria
Sports leagues established in 2019
2019 establishments in Austria
Basketball
Professional sports leagues in Austria